Justine Dufour-Lapointe (born March 25, 1994)  is a Canadian freestyle skier. She was the Olympic champion in the moguls event at the 2014 Winter Olympics and won a silver medal in moguls at the 2018 Winter Olympics. The gold and silver she and her sister Chloe Dufour-Lapointe won in 2014 was the first time that Canadian sisters stood together on the podium, and the fourth time ever by all nations. In winning the Olympics, she became the youngest freestyle skiing Olympic champion ever at nineteen years of age. Dufour-Lapointe was the FIS World Cup rookie of the year for the 2010–11 season. Dufour-Lapointe was the world champion in moguls at the 2015 World Championships has also won a silver and two other bronze medals in the moguls event at the Freestyle World Ski Championships.

Career
Justine Dufour-Lapointe started her young career during the 2010–11 FIS Freestyle Skiing World Cup. During that season, she became the youngest female winner of a FIS World Cup moguls event at the age of 16, winning the event in Mont Gabriel. She has two older sisters, Chloe Dufour-Lapointe and Maxime Dufour-Lapointe, who also compete in moguls.

She won her first major medal at the 2013 FIS Freestyle Skiing World Championships, where she placed third, winning the bronze behind the dominant Hannah Kearney, who had won the gold medal. Dufour-Lapointe had fallen during her qualification but managed to place a good second run to qualify for the final. This was a proud result for Dufour-Lapointe; given the adversity required to win the bronze, she stated, "I’m so happy about my medal today, but in fact, it’s not the medal so much as the path that I took to get it. The path was tough, but I made it."

At the 2014 Sochi Olympics, Dufour-Lapointe competed in Moguls along with her sisters Chloé and Maxime. This was the fifth time that three siblings competed at the Winter Games in the same event. Justine finished first overall in the event with a score of 22.44, with her sister Chloé placing second with a score of 21.66. With the result, she became the youngest freestyle skiing champion ever at the Winter Games. Thanks to the win, this earned the sisters' and  Canada's first gold and silver medals of the 2014 Sochi Olympics. Dufour-Lapointe said of the event with her sister and her excitement that "Holding Chloe's hand meant that I wasn't alone. I was in shock. I saw Chloe, and I felt calm. Holding her hand, I knew it would feel more like home."

The 2015 FIS World Championships were another event for Dufour-Lapointe to build her elite status. At these championships, she began by first winning the World Championship title in the mogul's event; she said, "My plan was simple. I wanted to find a balance between speed and technique. I stayed calm and focused during the day.  I was really in a zone. To get the Olympic gold medal and now the World Championship gold medal is a dream come true. I’ve grown so much since the Olympics and learned a lot. That experience helped me here." She accompanied her gold medal with a silver medal performance in the dual moguls in Kreischberg, Austria.

Dufour-Lapointe went into the 2018 Winter Olympics as an underdog and having trouble finding the podium with her usual regularity. She would qualify for the finals and the third run against five other competitors for the medal. She finished in second place in the final run, just one-tenth of a second away from the gold medal. Dufour-Lapointe noted the distinction between her two Olympics, saying, "I feel so different than I was in Sochi. In Sochi, I was completely a kid, enjoying this life, not knowing what's going on around. But today... I know what to do, to focus on myself, my ski, my line, my moment, and that's all. Because if not, I won't be proud of me."

On January 24, 2022, Dufour-Lapointe was named to Canada's 2022 Olympic team.

Personal life
Dufour-Lapointe studied Cégep distance education in humanities. She is the youngest of three skiing sisters.

World Cup results
All results are sourced from the International Ski Federation (FIS).

Season standings

Race Podiums
 14 wins – (10 , 4 )
 43 podiums – (26 , 17 )

Olympic results
 2 medals – (1 gold, 1 silver)

World Championships results
 4 medals – (1 gold, 1 silver, 2 bronze)

See also
List of Olympic medalist families

References

External links
 
 
 
 Freestyle Skiing Canada profile
 
 

1994 births
Living people
Canadian female freestyle skiers
French Quebecers
Skiers from Montreal
Freestyle skiers at the 2014 Winter Olympics
Freestyle skiers at the 2018 Winter Olympics
Freestyle skiers at the 2022 Winter Olympics
Medalists at the 2014 Winter Olympics
Medalists at the 2018 Winter Olympics
Olympic freestyle skiers of Canada
Olympic gold medalists for Canada
Olympic silver medalists for Canada
Olympic medalists in freestyle skiing